Job Plimpton born on February 27, 1784, and died in 1864, was one of the first American composers and an organ builder.

Publications
The Washington Choir (1843)

References

1784 births
1864 deaths
American male composers
19th-century American composers
19th-century American male musicians